Oligosaurus is a genus of iguanodont dinosaurs from the Late Cretaceous Grünbach Formation of Austria.

Discovery and species
In 1859 coal mine administrator Pawlowitsch notified the University of Vienna that some fossils had been found in the Gute Hoffnung mine at Muthmannsdorf in Austria. A team headed by geologists Eduard Suess and Ferdinand Stoliczka subsequently uncovered numerous bones of several species, among them those of an ornithopod dinosaur. Stored at the university museum, the finds remained undescribed until they were studied by Emanuel Bunzel from 1870 onwards. Bunzel in 1871 referred the scapula PIUW 3518 along with a humerus and metapodial (identified by him as a femoral fragment) to Lacerta sp. Seeley (1881) erected Oligosaurus for the scapula and considered the metapodial and humerus to be conspecific, while referring the paralectotype caudal vertebrae of Mochlodon suessi to the taxon. The generic name is derived from Greek oligos, "few", and sauros, "lizard". Norman and Weishampel (1990) and Norman (2004) listed Oligosaurus, along with Ornithomerus and Mochlodon, as a synonym of Rhabdodon. However, Sachs and Hornung (2006) assigned one of the specimens of Oligosaurus (the holotype scapula) to Zalmoxes sp. along with the Mochlodon suessi and Ornithomerus holotypes.

The type specimen PIUW 3518 was found in the Grünbach Formation of the Gosau Group dating from the early Campanian, about 80 million years old.

References 

Iguanodonts
Ornithischian genera
Campanian life
Late Cretaceous dinosaurs of Europe
Cretaceous Austria
Fossils of Austria
Fossil taxa described in 1881
Taxa named by Harry Seeley